Jean-Roger Milo, born in Paris, is a French actor.

Biography
After learning his craft at the theatre with Sacha Pitoëff, Jean-Roger Milo was noticed by the cinema. He appeared in the 1982 movie Ace of Aces alongside  Jean-Paul Belmondo. In 1993, he was nominated for a César Award for Best Supporting Actor for the role of Chaval in the film Germinal. He played a cop in L.627. In addition to blockbusters, he has also held roles in more modest productions such Prison at home or the Sagards movie.

Milo's earliest works were minor appearances in The Key to the Door (1978), Rosy the Gale (1979), and Mario Monicelli and the Band of Rex (1980). In 1980 he played the role of a criminal in The Woman Cop.

Milo worked with renowned directors like Bertrand Tavernier in films like A Sunday in the Country (1984) and The Life And Nothing Other (1989). Claude Berri cast Milo in Germinal (1993).

Filmography
 1982 : Toutes griffes dehors (TV Mini-Series)
 1984 : A Sunday in the Country
 1985 : Among Wolves
 1986 : Sarrounia
 1992 : L.627
 1993 : Germinal

References

Living people
20th-century French male actors
Year of birth missing (living people)